The Tulane Green Wave football statistical leaders are individual statistical leaders of the Tulane Green Wave football program in various categories, including passing, rushing, receiving, total offense, defensive stats, and kicking. Within those areas, the lists identify single-game, single-season, and career leaders. The Green Wave represent Tulane University in the NCAA Division I FBS American Athletic Conference.

Although Tulane began competing in intercollegiate football in 1893, the school's official record book considers the "modern era" to have begun in 1939. Records from before this year are often incomplete and inconsistent, and they are generally not included in these lists.

These lists are dominated by more recent players for several reasons:
 Since 1939, seasons have increased from 10 games to 11 and then 12 games in length.
 The NCAA didn't allow freshmen to play varsity football until 1972 (with the exception of the World War II years), allowing players to have four-year careers.
 Bowl games only began counting toward single-season and career statistics in 2002. The Green Wave have since played in six bowl games, giving players in those seasons an extra game to accumulate statistics.
 Tulane played in (and won) the American Conference championship game in 2022, giving players in that season yet another game to amass statistics..
 Eight of Tulane's nine highest seasons in total offensive yards have come since 1998.

These lists are updated through the 2022 season.

Passing

Passing yards

Passing touchdowns

Rushing

Rushing yards

Rushing touchdowns

Receiving

Receptions

Receiving yards

Receiving touchdowns

Total offense
Total offense is the sum of passing and rushing statistics. It does not include receiving or returns.

Total offense yards

Touchdowns responsible for
"Touchdowns responsible for" is the NCAA's official term for combined passing and rushing touchdowns.

Defense

Interceptions

Tackles

Sacks

Kicking

Field goals made

Field goal percentage
Tulane's record book specifies a minimum of 10 made to qualify for its career leaderboard, and a minimum of 7 made to qualify for its season leaderboard.

References

Tulane